Sylvia Wood is a New Zealand businesswoman, currently serving as President of the New Zealand National Party. She succeeded Peter Goodfellow.

Wood was raised in the South Island. She owns and runs a human resources consultancy. Wood also worked as a relations specialist. She joined the New Zealand National Party in 2014 and its board in 2021, being elected as its president on 7 August 2022. 

Wood is a member of the Employment Law Institute and the Institute of Directors.

She currently lives in Auckland.

References

See also 
 New Zealand National Party

New Zealand National Party
New Zealand businesspeople
Living people
Year of birth missing (living people)